Intens is a television news entertainment program formatting infotainment that is broadcast on the Indonesian TV station RCTI. This program replaced Silet, which program was suspended by the Indonesian Broadcasting Commission (KPI). and primarily reports on celebrity news and gossip, along with previews of upcoming films and television shows, regular segments about all of those three subjects, along with overall film and television industry news.

This program ended on 16 March 2018, On 7 January 2019 this program has change titled to Intens Reborn broadcast by iNews.

Since 2021, Intens is now present as social media content, on the YouTube channel under the name Intens Investigasi, and is also present on Instagram and Facebook.

References

External links 

 Intens di RCTI.tv 
 

Indonesian television news shows
Indonesian-language television shows
2010 Indonesian television series debuts
2010 Indonesian television seasons
2018 Indonesian television series endings
RCTI original programming
Entertainment news shows in Indonesia
Mass media in Indonesia stubs
Asian television show stubs